is a town located in Agawa District, Kōchi Prefecture, Japan.

Geography
Ino is located in the Shikoku Mountains of north-central Kōchi Prefecture.

Neighbouring municipalities 
Kōchi Prefecture
  Kōnan
 Tosa
 Tosa
 Ōkawa
 Ochi
 Hidaka
 Niyodogawa
Ehime Prefecture
Niihama
Saijō
 Kumakōgen

Climate
Ino has a humid subtropical climate (Köppen climate classification Cfa) with hot, humid summers and cool winters. There is significant precipitation throughout the year, especially during June and July.

Demographics
Per Japanese census data, the population of Ino in 2020 is 21,374 people. Ino has been conducting censuses since 1920.

History 
As with all of Kōchi Prefecture, the area of Ino was part of ancient Tosa Province.  During the Edo period, the area was part of the holdings of Tosa Domain ruled by the Yamauchi clan from their seat at Kōchi Castle. Following the Meiji restoration, the village of Ino was established within Agawa District, Kōchi with the creation of the modern municipalities system on October 1, 1889. On October 1, 2004 the village of Gohoku, also from Agawa District, and the village of Hongawa, from Tosa District, were merged into Ino, increasing its size by almost a factor of five.

Government
Ino has a mayor-council form of government with a directly elected mayor and a unicameral town council of 18 members. Ino, together with the municipalities of Agawa District, contributes two members to the Kōchi Prefectural Assembly. In terms of national politics, the town is part of Kōchi 2nd district of the lower house of the Diet of Japan.

Economy
Traditionally, agriculture, forestry and paper production were mainstays of the local economy.

Education
Ino has seven public elementary schools and five public middle schools operated by the town government and two public high schools operated by the Kōchi Prefectural Department of Education.

Transportation

Railway
  JR Shikoku - Dosan Line
  -  - 
 Tosaden Kōtsū - Ino Line (tram line)
  -  -  -  -  -  -  -  -  -

Highways 
  Kōchi Expressway

Sister city relations
 - Cotia, São Paulo, Brazil, since June 16, 1966

Local attractions
 Ino Paper Museum

Noted people from Ino
Arase Nagahide, sumo wrestler and television personality

References

External links

 Ino official website 

Towns in Kōchi Prefecture
Ino, Kōchi